Heinrich Laube (18 September 1806 – 1 August 1884), German dramatist, novelist and theatre-director, was born at Sprottau in Prussian Silesia.

Life
He studied theology at Halle and Breslau (1826–1829), and settled in Leipzig in 1832. Here he at once came into prominence with his political essays, collected under the title Das neue Jahrhundert, in two parts — Polen (1833) and Politische Briefe (1833) — and with the novel Das junge Europa, in three parts — Die Poeten, Die Krieger, Die Bürger — (1833–1837).

These writings, in which, after the fashion of Heinrich Heine and Ludwig Börne, he severely criticized the political regime in Germany, together with the part he played in the literary movement known as “Das junge Deutschland,” led to his being subjected to police surveillance and his works confiscated. On his return, in 1834, from a journey to Italy, undertaken in the company of Karl Gutzkow, Laube was expelled from Saxony and imprisoned for nine months in Berlin. In 1836 he married the widow of Professor Hänel of Leipzig; almost immediately afterwards he suffered a year's imprisonment for his revolutionary sympathies. He was the stepfather of Albert Hänel.

In 1839, he again settled in Leipzig and began a literary activity as a playwright. Chief among his earlier productions are the tragedies Monaldeschi (1845) and Struensee (1847); the comedies Rokoko, oder die alten Herren (1846); Gottsched und Gellert (1847); and Die Karlsschüler (1847), of which the youthful Friedrich Schiller is the hero.

In 1848, Laube was elected to the Frankfurt Parliament for the district of Elbogen, but resigned in the spring of 1849, when he was appointed artistic director of the Hofburg theatre in Vienna. This office he held until 1867, and in this period fall his finest dramatic productions, notably the tragedies Graf Essex (1856) and Montrose (1859), and his historical romance Der deutsche Krieg (1865–1866, 9 vols), which graphically pictures a period in the Thirty Years' War.

In 1869, he became director of the Leipzig Stadttheater, but returned to Vienna in 1870, where in 1872 he was placed at the head of the new Stadttheater; with the exception of a short interval he managed this theatre with brilliant success until his retirement from public life in 1880. He has left a valuable record of his work in Vienna and Leipzig in the three volumes Das Burgtheater (1868), Das norddeutsche Theater (1872) and Das Wiener Stadttheater (1875).

He was still active after his retirement, and in the five years preceding his death in Vienna on 1 August 1884, he wrote the romances and novels Die Böhminger (1880), Louison (1881), Der Schatten-Wilhelm (1883), and published an interesting volume of reminiscences, Erinnerungen, 1841–1881 (1882).

Assessment
Laube's dramas are not remarkable for originality or for poetical beauty; their real and great merit lies in their stage-craft. As a theater manager he had no equal in Germany, and his services in this capacity have assured him a more lasting name in German literary history than his writings.

Works

Other novels
Besides those mentioned above, other of his novels of note are:
Das Glück (1837)
Der Prätendent (1842)
Die Grafin Chateaubriand (1843)

Other dramas
Other dramas of note include:
Böse Zungen (1868)
Demetrius (1872)

Collected works
His Gesammelte Schriften (excluding his dramas) were published in 16 vols (1875–1882); his Dramatische Werke, in 13 vols (1845–1875); a popular edition of the latter in 12 vols (1880–1892). An edition of Laube's Ausgewählte Werke in 10 vols appeared in 1906 with an introduction by H. H. Houben.

Notes

References 
   This work in turn cites:
Johannes Proelß, Das junge Deutschland (1892)
Heinrich Bulthaupt, Dramaturgie des Schauspiels (vol. iii., 6th ed., 1901)
   This work in turn cites:
Gottschall, “Heinrich Laube,” in Unsere Zeit, vol. ii. (1884)

External links 

1806 births
1884 deaths
People from Szprotawa
People from the Province of Silesia
19th-century German novelists
19th-century German dramatists and playwrights
German expatriates in Austria
German male novelists
German male dramatists and playwrights
Members of the Frankfurt Parliament
Martin Luther University of Halle-Wittenberg alumni
University of Breslau alumni
19th-century German male writers
19th-century German writers
People from Bad Muskau